Ezechiel Webbe (9 July 1658 – 13 September 1704) was an Anglican priest in Ireland at the end of 17th and the beginning of the 18th centuries.

Webbe was born in Athlone and educated at Corpus Christi College, Oxford and Trinity College, Dublin. He was Archdeacon of Kildare from  1675 to 1681.  Webbe was appointed  Dean of Limerick in 1691 and Archdeacon of Aghadoe in 1692, holding both posts until his death.

References

1704 deaths
Alumni of Trinity College Dublin
18th-century Irish Anglican priests
17th-century Irish Anglican priests
1658 births
Deans of Limerick
People from Athlone
Archdeacons of Aghadoe